David Perryman (born March 29, 1957) is an American politician who served in the Oklahoma House of Representatives from the 56th district from 2012 to 2020.

References

1957 births
Living people
Democratic Party members of the Oklahoma House of Representatives
21st-century American politicians